The Grand Concourse is an integrated walkway and green space network connecting 10 municipalities in the Province of Newfoundland and Labrador. The Grand Concourse is managed by the Grand Concourse Authority, a non-profit organization with a board of directors made up of representatives from a variety of community-based and government groups.

Origins 
The Grand Concourse was first developed through the generosity of the Johnson Family Foundation with Paul Johnson as its president and founder. A series of studies commissioned between 1989 and 1992 by the Foundation established the feasibility of connecting walks and parks via the publicly owned shorelines of aquatic networks throughout the St. John's Urban Region. Trails had already been built by St. John's, the Province of Newfoundland and Labrador, Parks Canada, and the Quidi Vidi/Rennie's River Development Foundation, providing a start for the Grand Concourse. Four demonstration Walkways were built by the Johnson Family Foundation:

 Lake-to-Lookout
 Cuckold Cove (from Signal Hill to Quidi Vidi Lake)
 Rennie's River to Memorial University
 Riverdale to Memorial University

An overall plan was developed to extend the Walkway Network from Signal Hill in the east, to Octagon Pond in the west. This plan was completed in 2004 but efforts continue by involved members to maintain and further develop the Grand Concourse.

The Grand Concourse Authority 
In 1994, the Grand Concourse Authority (GCA) was established under a Provincial Charter with a mandate to design and construct the Grand Concourse. It is a charitable, non-profit organization, currently comprising 15 member groups who contribute funds for operations. Members have included Crown Corporations, Community Organizations, and all levels of Government.

Together the Members of the GCA have completed over 350 community-development projects since 1994. As of 2006, the cost to construct the Walkway Network was well over $27 million.

Today, the GCA runs an extensive maintenance program, primarily in the City of St. John's, while continuing walkway expansion throughout the Northeast Avalon Region of Newfoundland. The Authority also participates in various environmental initiatives, open space and park development projects, as well as promotion and public education

List of Members
The following municipalities, agencies, crown corporations, and organizations make up the Board of the Grand Concourse Authority:
 City of St. John's
 City of Mount Pearl
 Town of Paradise
 Town of Conception Bay South
 Town of Portugal Cove-St. Philip's
 Town of Torbay
 Town of Logy Bay-Middle Cove-Outer Cove 
 Town of Flatrock
 Town of Pouch Cove
 Town of Bay Bulls
 Bowring Park Foundation
 Johnson Family Foundation
 Manuels River
 Memorial University of Newfoundland and Labrador
 C.A. Pippy Park Commission
 St. John's Port Authority
 Suncor Energy Fluvarium

List of Grand Concourse Walks
The following walkways and trails are considered part of the Grand Concourse network:

Awards and Accolades 
 Canadian Parks and Recreation Association, 2001 - Award for Excellence in Innovation.
 Newfoundland T'Railway Council, 2001 - Trailblazer of the Year Award.
 St. John's Clean and Beautiful, Community Organization Award 2003 - Harbourside Park.
 Historic Sites Association of Newfoundland and Labrador, Manning Heritage Award 2003 (Shared) - Bishop Spencer School Memorial.
 Canadian Society of Landscape Architects, National Honour Award 2003.
 CSLA Regional Honour Award 2004 - Bowring Park Duck Pond Rehabilitation Project.
 CSLA Regional Citation Award 2005 - Walkway Maintenance Manual.
 American Society of Landscape Architects 2005 - National Honor Award.
 Canadian Institute of Planners, 2011 - Vision in Planning Award.

References

External links
 Official Site

Transport in St. John's, Newfoundland and Labrador
Tourism in Newfoundland and Labrador
Parks in Newfoundland and Labrador
Linear parks